Acceleration Team Germany is the German team of Formula Acceleration 1, an international racing series. They are run by the Swedish Performance Racing team, owned by Bobby Issazadhe.

History

2014 season 
Drivers: Sebastian Balthasar

The team announced Sebastian Balthasar as their driver for the inaugural Formula Acceleration 1 season.

Drivers

Complete Formula Acceleration 1 Results

References 

Germany
National sports teams of Germany
German auto racing teams